Walter E. Stebbins High School is part of the Mad River Local School District. The school is located in Riverside, Ohio, United States and serves over 1000 students.  Stebbins's mascot is the Indian.  The new portion of the school building was opened in August 2005. Stebbins is well known for its technical prep program, which offers a "major" for students in fields such as Graphic Design, HVAC, Construction, Manufacturing, and Engineering.  Those who complete the two-year program also receive a scholarship to Sinclair Community College.

Stebbins met ten of the twelve state indicators for the 2010–2011 school year (missing the State targets for 10th and 11th Grade Science), earning it an "Effective" rating.

The AFJROTC red beret drill team won state titles for 18 years in a row, as well as four national titles.

On February 29, 2008, Stebbins won its first team Ohio High School Athletic Association state championship in any sport when the Boys' Bowling team beat Centerville 802–766.  As of 2019–20, Stebbins is a member of the Miami Valley League (MVL).

Notable alumni
 Dave Coleman, former MLB outfielder
 Charles Michael Davis, actor
 Joe Greene, two time Olympic bronze medalist long jumper
 Jamal Robertson, NFL and CFL running back

References

External links
Official School website

High schools in Montgomery County, Ohio
Public high schools in Ohio